Domenico Negrone (Genoa, 1672 - Genoa, 1736) was the 147th Doge of the Republic of Genoa and king of Corsica.

Biography 
Negrone's election as doge of the Republic of Genoa took place on 13 October 1723, the one hundred and second in two-year succession and the one hundred and forty-seventh in republican history. As doge he was also invested with the related biennial office of king of Corsica. In his mandate the doge Negrone decreed a 10% increase in taxes on goods coming from the Grand Duchy of Tuscany, a measure already implemented during the slate of the predecessor Cesare De Franchi Toso which already caused a collapse of commercial traffic and which, in a tight turn, was consequently canceled. He ended the Dogate on October 13, 1725, but continued to serve the republic in other public jobs. Negrone died in Genoa in 1736.

See also 

 Republic of Genoa
 Doge of Genoa

References 

18th-century Doges of Genoa
1672 births
1736 deaths